Kathleen Dorothy Cavendish Murray (1 October 1908 – 23 January 2000), who was billed as Kay Cavendish, was a British classically trained pianist and popular entertainer.

Life 
Cavendish was born in Hong Kong to John Alexander Shakespear Murray and his wife, Constance Ellen Louisa Clarke. She studied at the Royal Academy of Music, where she was awarded a gold medal. She became a member of The Cavendish Three, a close harmony trio. and made over 400 episodes of her weekly BBC radio programme, 'Kay on the Keys'.

She appeared on It's That Man Again, during World War II, entertained troops for ENSA., and, in 1949, appeared in the film Poet's Pub.

She appeared as a castaway on the BBC Radio programme Desert Island Discs on 5 February 1962.

She died in Tunbridge Wells, Kent, aged 89.

References

External links 
 
 Personality Meet Kay Cavendish 1945 British-Pathé newsreel featuring Cavendish

1908 births
2000 deaths
20th-century British pianists
Hong Kong pianists
Alumni of the Royal Academy of Music
20th-century British women singers
British classical pianists
20th-century women pianists